Sam Slade is a Canadian former politician. Slade was elected to the Newfoundland and Labrador House of Assembly in a by-election on November 26, 2013 and sworn in on December 11, 2013. He represented the electoral district of Carbonear-Harbour Grace as a member of the Liberal Party of Newfoundland and Labrador from 2013 until 2015. In 2015, Slade lost the Liberal nomination in Carbonear - Trinity - Bay de Verde to MHA Steve Crocker.

Prior to his election to the legislature, Slade was the mayor of Carbonear from 2005 to 2013. He ran for mayor again in 2017 but lost to Frank Butt.
In 2021, Slade ran for councillor in Carbonear. He was elected and was sworn in as deputy mayor.

Electoral record
}
|-

|-

|align="right"|2,313
|align="right"|42.12%
|align="right"|-34.17

|NDP
|Charlene Sudbrink
|align="right"|410
|align="right"|7.47%
|align="right"|-1.03

|}

References

Liberal Party of Newfoundland and Labrador MHAs
Mayors of places in Newfoundland and Labrador
Living people
People from Carbonear
21st-century Canadian politicians
Year of birth missing (living people)